Kandy Youth Cricket Club was a first class cricket team in Sri Lanka which competed in the Premier Trophy.

See also
 List of Sri Lankan cricket teams

References

Former senior cricket clubs of Sri Lanka